John Joseph Jones (10 March 1907 – 22 March 1997) was an Australian politician.

He was born in Seymour to carpenter Charles Alexander Jones and Sarah Anne Bryant. He attended the local primary school and became a telegraph messenger and telephone technician. In 1928 he joined the Labor Party, and in 1934 was a founding member of the Nhill branch; he also served as secretary of the Stawell branch for 23 years. On 5 May 1936 he married Alice Edna Paschke, with whom he had a daughter. During World War II he was a signalman. In 1952 he was elected to the Victorian Legislative Council for Ballarat Province. He served until his defeat in 1958 and did not return to parliament, although he ran unsuccessfully for both upper and lower house seats in 1961, 1964, 1967 and 1970. Jones died in 1997.

References

1907 births
1997 deaths
Australian Labor Party members of the Parliament of Victoria
Members of the Victorian Legislative Council
20th-century Australian politicians